Frank Stiefel is an American filmmaker and photographer. His film Heaven Is a Traffic Jam on the 405 won the Oscar for Best Documentary Short Subject.

Career 
Stiefel was born to a Jewish family in New York and attended The City College of New York. Stiefel's career in the television business began in the 1970s, when he was making commercials, among other things. In 1999 he was the executive producer of the documentary short film Two Weddings. He made his directorial debut in 2009 with the movie Ingelore, a short film about the Jewish Holocaust survivor Ingelore Herz Honigstein. The documentary, which he dedicated to his mother, tells the story of how his mother has survived being raped by two Nazis and managed to flee to the United States. This film was presented at film festivals and broadcast on the station HBO.

Frank Stiefel is married and has two daughters.

Filmography
Producer 
 2017: Bose Angelo (Short) (executive producer) (completed) 
 2016: ''Heaven is a Traffic Jam on the 405 (Documentary short) (producer) 
 2009: Ingelore (Documentary short) (producer) 
 2008: Two Roads to the Taupo 1000 (TV Movie documentary) (executive producer) 
 2007: Two Roads to Baja (TV Movie documentary) (executive producer) 
 2002: A Stoner's Life (Short) (producer) 
 1999: Two Weddings (Documentary short) (executive producer) 
Director 
 2016: ''Heaven is a Traffic Jam on the 405 (Documentary short) 
 2009: Ingelore (Documentary short) 
Cinematographer 
 2016: Heaven is a Traffic Jam on the 405 (Documentary short) 
Other 
 2009: Ingelore (Documentary short) (camera operator) 
 1980: Mr. & Mrs. Dracula (TV Series) (assistant to the producer - 1 episode) 
 2011: ''Stage 5''' (TV Series, himself)

References

External links
  
 

Living people
American producers
American Jews
American directors
American photographers
Directors of Best Documentary Short Subject Academy Award winners
City College of New York alumni
Year of birth missing (living people)